Ajay Data  is an Indian entrepreneur with interest in IT and Edible Oil. He is elected Chair of Universal Acceptance Steering Group (UASG). Data led the creation of one of the world's first linguistic email address mobile apps for Internationalized Domain Names domains. He provided leadership as chair to bring  Nepal, Sri Lanka, Bangladesh and Indian language Top level domain (TLD) into root servers.  He has been recently credited with Graham Bell Award for this innovation and Pt Deendayal Upadhyay Excellence Award for work in languages and script. ICANN-UASG case study explains and talk about it in detail. He had proposed a standard for downgrading with Alias, which was accepted and recommended as best practice by Universal Acceptance Steering Group. His mobile app provides access email access in 19 languages including Cyrillic, Arabic, Thai, Mandarin, Korean and 15 Indian languages. which is available through DataMail app.

Early life and education

Ajay Data was born on 22 March 1973 in Khairthal, Alwar District Rajasthan. After completing his school education from Indra Happy School and Government Higher Secondary School, Khairthal, he moved to Jaipur for college studies.

After completion of his studies in 1999, Data founded Data Infosys Ltd, now called as Data Ingenious Global Ltd, in Rajasthan.

Ajay Data @ ICANN
He is co-chair of ICANN Neo Brahmi Generation Panel. He was EAI Coordinator in UASG.TECH and Member of ISPCP Constituency. He is also member of Expert Panel for Root Zone LGR application. He has been appointed (first Indian) for ccNSO Council by NOMCOM for the term to start from Oct 2018. In March 2020 results were announced by UASG where he was unopposed elected chairman for UASG for 2021 to 2023.

Other Associations

Data has been part of RITEG (Rajasthan IT Entrepreuners Group),Founder & President TiE Rajasthan, Founder President YEO Jaipur (now known as EO), Nasscom, Data Security Council of India, Jaipur Citizen Forum, Advisory board of AIESEC, board member of Faculty of Management Studies (Poddar College) - Rajasthan University, Mentor in Rajasthan Venture Capital Fund, PHD Chamber of Commerce & Industry - Rajasthan, Chamber of Commerce & Industry, FICCI - Rajasthan. Member - Rajasthan Angel Investors Network (RAIN).

He was part of a business delegation led by the Prime Minister of India Manmohan Singh.

He has been appointed  Chair of Pre-IIGF ; First event of Govt of India on Internet Governance Forum, which is part of UNs IGF.

Multilingual Internet@India

Data has been part of volunteers panel created by ICANN named Neo Brahmi Generation Panel which created label generation rules for Top Level Domain names to enable official language of Nepal, Bangladesh, Sri Lanka and India.

Data was appointed member by Ministry of Electronics & Information Technology &, Govt of India  in  Stake Holder group] for Universa Acceptance and Multilingual Internet.

Awards and honours
The "Man to Watch in 2004" by Times of India
Lufthansa "Pioneering Spirit" - ET NOW - 2011
"Rajasthan Gaurav" - Sanskriti - Jaipur, Rajasthan - 2013
Ministers of Change- CNBC 18 TV
IT Innovator of the Year - Peter Hass, US Indo American Society. 2013
Rajasthan Ke SuperStar by ETV Rajasthan. 2013
IT innovator of the Year - Business Rankers Magazine 2015
Shaan-E-Rajasthan - Felicitated by Governor of Rajasthan
On the cover of CIO Review - May 2016
Tech face of Rajasthan
Graham Bell Award for best innovation in Enterprise Solution Category 2017
Co-chair NBGP - Neo Brahami General Panel - ICANN
Chairman  Assocham Rajasthan

References

1973 births
Living people
Businesspeople in software
Businesspeople from Rajasthan